Tedi Cara (born 15 April 2000) is an Albanian football player. He plays as a forward for FK Partizani Tirana football club in Kategoria Superiore and the Albania national under-21 football team.

References

External links

2000 births
Living people
Footballers from Kavajë
Albanian footballers
Association football midfielders
Besa Kavajë players
FK Partizani Tirana players
Kategoria e Parë players
Tedi